This is a list of South Asian-origin television channels available on cable, satellite and IPTV platforms in Canada, Malaysia, the Middle East, Singapore, Trinidad and Tobago, the United Kingdom and the United States. Channels broadcasting from different regions of India, Pakistan and Bangladesh are available in Bengali, English, Gujarati, Hindi, Bhojpuri, Kannada, Malayalam, Marathi, Odia,  Punjabi, Tamil, Telugu and Urdu.

List of channels

Australia

Canada

Hong Kong

Malaysia

Middle East

Singapore

Trinidad and Tobago

United States

References

South Asian